Talbert Monsell Forrest (10 October 1923 – January 1999) was a Jamaican politician. He was born in Springfield, St. Mary, Jamaica on 10 October 1923. He was speaker in the House of Representatives from 1980–1983. Forrest died in January 1999, at the age of 75.

See also
 List of speakers of the House of Representatives of Jamaica

References

1923 births
1999 deaths
Jamaica Labour Party politicians
Speakers of the House of Representatives of Jamaica